Brno International Business School (B.I.B.S.) is a private university based in Brno and Prague provides degree programs in business and administration.

History 
1998: Foundation of B.I.B.S.

2008: B.I.B.S. is ranked as the second-best business school in Czech Republic by EDUNIVERSAL in the category “Excellent Business School, nationally strong and with continental links”[1] 

2009: B.I.B.S. grew steadily to become the largest provider of MBA programs in the Czech Republic with up to 568 students. 

2011: B.I.B.S. became a member of the AMSP CR thus confirming its core mission, namely to assist to the development of local Small and medium sized firms.

2012: Creation and delivery of European Commission funded program in Strategic Management for SMEs managers/owners.

2020: B.I.B.S. is ranked by Eduniversal with three palms.

2022: B.I.B.S. is a member of the Franco-Czech Chamber of Commerce.

International 
B.I.B.S. cooperates locally with Mendel University Brno and internationally with the Universita degli Studi di Trento in Italy, the University of Wisconsin Whitewater, Umeå University in Sweden, Nicolaus Copernicus University in Toruń in Poland, the University of Mainz in Germany, City University of Seattle in Slovakia and Jönköping International Business School in Sweden.

Programs 
B.I.B.S. specializes in both economic-managerial and legal fields. The programs are attractive thanks to a very high success rate of 96%[1]. Its economic-managerial programmes belongs among the top best in Czech Republic. [2] Moreover, the school also focuses on commercial law in general and especially on international commercial law.

Bachelor 

• Bachelor of Business Administration

Master's degree 

• Master in Business Administration

• Executive MBA

• Msc in Sustainable management

Doctoral 

• Doctorate in Business and Administration (DBA)

Short - term management courses 

In addition to degree programs, B.I.B.S. provides the opportunity to engage in continuous education in diverse fields of management according to students’ professional focus. The offer includes Strategic Marketing Management, medical facilities, human resources, production processes and services, corporate finance, corporate information, purchasing.

Notable alumni 
• MUDr. Vít Němeček, MBA, director of the Jablonec nad Nisou Hospital

• Ing. Tomáš Vican, MBA, owner of the Wine Gallery, producer, lecturer B.I.B.S.

• MUDr. Tomáš Julínek, MBA, former Minister of Health

• PhDr. Richard Svoboda, MBA, senator and former mayor of Brno

• Prof. MUDr. Tomáš Zima, DrSc., MBA, Dean of the 1st Faculty of Medicine, Charles University

• Ing. Daniel Beneš, MBA, CEO and Chairman of the Board of Directors of ČEZ

References 

Education in Brno
Buildings and structures in Brno
Private universities and colleges in Europe
Business schools in the Czech Republic
Educational institutions established in 1998
1998 establishments in the Czech Republic